Kattathur (South) is a village in the Udayarpalayam taluk of Ariyalur district, Tamil Nadu, India.

Demographics 

As per the 2001 census, Kattathur (South) had a total population of 1858 with 943 males and 915 females.

References 

Villages in Ariyalur district